The 2019–20 World Rugby Sevens Series was the 21st annual series of rugby sevens tournaments for national men's rugby sevens teams. The Sevens Series has been run by World Rugby since 1999–2000.

In March 2020, World Rugby postponed all remaining tournaments in the series due to the COVID-19 pandemic. The events in London and Paris were postponed provisionally until September, preceding the Singapore and Hong Kong events previously postponed until October. On 30 June, the remaining four rounds of the series was cancelled which meant that New Zealand was awarded the title by 11 points over second place South Africa.

Format
Sixteen nations competed at each event, drawn into four pools of four teams. Following the pool matches at each tournament, the top eight teams (two teams from each pool) played off for a Cup, with gold, silver and bronze medals also awarded to the first three teams. The bottom eight teams after the pool matches played off for the lower-ranked placings from ninth to sixteenth at each tournament. The winner of the series was determined by the overall points standings gained across all events in the season.

Challenger Series and the COVID-19 pandemic

World Rugby announced in December 2019 that there would be a feeder competition to the Sevens Series consisting of sixteen teams that would play two sevens events in South America, determining the final eight teams to play in a playoff-style event at the Hong Kong Sevens. The final winner would be promoted to the World Rugby Sevens Series and replace the invitational side in the Sevens Series.

As a result of the COVID-19 pandemic, World Rugby postponed the Sevens Series and Challenger Series seasons to be completed at a later date in the year before subsequently cancelling the season entirely. Because of both competitions  seasons being cancelled, the final playoff in Hong Kong to decide the team who would be promoted to the Sevens Series would not be decided and the team with the highest points tally would be the promoted team. Japan, an invited team to five of the six Sevens Series events was promoted having accumulated thirty-nine points in total, three points clear at the top of the table.

Core teams
The fifteen "core teams" qualified to participate in all series events for 2019–20 were: 

Ireland joined as a core team for the first time after winning the 2019–20 World Series qualifier held in Hong Kong. They replaced Japan who were relegated after finishing as the lowest-placed core team in 2018–19. However, Japan will play in several tournaments as the wild card team in preparation to host the Olympic tournament.

Tour venues
The official schedule for the 2019–20 World Rugby Sevens Series was:

Events in Singapore and Hong Kong were originally scheduled to be played in April 2020 but were postponed due to health concerns relating to the COVID-19 pandemic and rescheduled to October 2020. In June 2020, World Rugby cancelled all four remaining rounds of the tournament (Singapore, Hong Kong, England and France) due to the pandemic.

Standings

Official standings for the 2019–20 series:

Source: World Rugby

Note:

Players

Scoring leaders

Updated: 11 March 2020

See also

 2019–20 World Rugby Women's Sevens Series
 Rugby sevens at the 2020 Summer Olympics

References

Sources

External links
Official site

 
World Rugby Sevens Series
World Rugby
World Rugby
World Rugby Sevens Series